Wakiya (written: 脇谷 or 脇屋) is a Japanese surname. Notable people with the surname include:

, Japanese baseball player
, Japanese chef

See also
5847 Wakiya, main-belt asteroid

Japanese-language surnames